The 122nd Infantry Division (German: 122. Infanterie-Division) was a German division in World War II. It was formed on 5 October 1940 as part of the 11th wave (Austellungswelle)

It was formed from elements of the 32nd Infantry Division, 258th Infantry Division and non-motorized elements of the 14th Motorized Infantry Division.

Organisation

Commanding officers
Generalleutnant Sigfrid Macholz (5 October 1940 – 8 December 1941)
Generalleutnant Friedrich Bayer (8 December 1941 – 17 February 1942)
Generalleutnant Sigfrid Macholz (17 February 1942 – 1 August 1942)
Generalleutnant Kurt Chill (1 August 1942 – 10 October 1942)
Generalleutnant Gustav Hundt (10 October 1942 – ? November 1942)
Generalleutnant Sigfrid Macholz (? November 1942 – 1 December 1942)
Generalmajor Adolf Westhoff (1 December 1942 – 8 January 1943)
Generalmajor Adolf Trowitz (8 January 1943 – 15 May 1943)
Generalleutnant Alfred Thielmann (15 May 1943 – 27 June 1943)
Generalleutnant Kurt Chill (27 June 1943 – 1 February 1944)
Generalmajor Johann-Albrecht von Blücher (1 February 1944 – 4 February 1944)
Generalmajor Hero Breusing (4 February 1944 – 25 August 1944)
General der Infanterie Friedrich Fangohr (25 August 1944 – 20 January 1945)
Generalmajor Bruno Schatz (20 January 1945 – 8 May 1945)

External links

Infantry divisions of Germany during World War II
Military units and formations established in 1940
20th century in Mecklenburg-Western Pomerania
1940 establishments in Germany
Military units and formations disestablished in 1945